Shamsul Ulama ( "sun of the scholars") is a religious title that has been taken by or granted to various individuals in India including:
 Maulvi Nazir Ahmed (1836–1912)
 Shibli Nomani (1857–1914)
 Shah Badruddin (1852–after 1920)
 Jivanji Jamshedji Modi (1854–1933), Zoroastrian priest
 E. K. Aboobacker Musliar (1914–1996), leader of Kerala Muslims
 Imdad Imam Asar, Indian Poet, Critic and Writer.

References

Arabic words and phrases